Walcutt is a surname. Notable people with the surname include:

Charles C. Walcutt (1838–1898), American surveyor, soldier, and politician
William Walcutt (1819–1882), American painter and sculptor

See also
Walcott (surname)
Walcutt and Leeds, American record manufacturing company